The 1942 Paris–Tours was the 36th edition of the Paris–Tours cycle race and was held on 31 May 1942. The race started in Paris and finished in Tours. The race was won by Paul Maye.

General classification

References

1942 in French sport
1942
May 1942 sports events